Perityle emoryi is a species of flowering plant in the aster family known by the common name Emory's rockdaisy. It is native to the Southwestern United States, northwest Mexico, and the Baja California Peninsula. It is a common wildflower of the deserts, and can also be found in California coastal regions.

It grows in many types of habitat, it tolerates disturbance, and it can become somewhat weedy. The plant is also known from Chile and Peru and it is an introduced species in parts of Hawaii. Its distribution is apparently expanding.

Description
Perityle emoryi, a polyploid plant, is quite variable genetically and in appearance. It is an annual herb growing 2 to 60 centimeters tall, its stem small, delicate, and simple, or thick, branching, and sprawling. It is usually hairy and glandular in texture. The alternately arranged leaves have blades of various shapes which are toothed or divided into lobes and borne on petioles.

The inflorescence is a single flower head or an array of a few or many heads. The head is hemispherical to bell-shaped and generally no more than a centimeter wide. The head has a center of many golden disc florets and a fringe of 8 to 12 white ray florets each just a few millimeters long. The fruit is an achene, usually with a pappus at the tip.

References

External links
Jepson Manual Treatment = Perityle emoryi
USDA Plants Profile
 UC CalPhoto gallers gallery of Perityle emoryi 

Perityleae
Flora of the Southwestern United States
Flora of Baja California
Flora of Baja California Sur
Flora of the California desert regions
Flora of Sonora
Flora of Chile
Flora of the Sonoran Deserts
Natural history of the Mojave Desert
Natural history of the Colorado Desert
Taxa named by John Torrey
Flora without expected TNC conservation status